The Gander Stakes is an ungraded stakes race for New York bred Thoroughbred race horses, three-years-old and older, run at Belmont Park or at Aqueduct Racetrack.  The Gander serves as a prep for the Evan Shipman Handicap running at Belmont Park which is restricted to New York breeds.

Inaugurated in 2005, and named for one of New York state’s favorite home-breds and racing millionaires, Gander, the race is set at one mile and offers a purse of $100,000.

This race is not listed on either the official Aqueduct or Belmont sites as running from 2009 to 2015.

The Gander Stakes has been run at Aqueduct Racetrack since 2016.

The race was not ran from 2008 to 2015.

Records 

Most wins by a jockey:

 2 – Dylan Davis (2018, 2022)
 2 – Manuel Franco (2016, 2023)

Most wins by a trainer:

 No trainer has won this race more than once

Most wins by an owner:

 No owner has won this race more than once

Past winners

*The original winner Maker's Candy won the race but was disqualified due to interference.

External links
 NYRA - Aqueduct Racetrack official site
 Belmont's official site

Aqueduct Racetrack
Belmont Park
Horse races in New York (state)
Restricted stakes races in the United States
Recurring sporting events established in 2005
Recurring events disestablished in 2007
2005 establishments in New York (state)